The Arabian worm lizard (Agamodon arabicus) is a species of reptiles in the family Trogonophidae. It is found in the southern part of the Arabian peninsula in Yemen. The population is unknown as it has only been recorded in the past 100 years. The threats are also unknown but does not seem to be threatened by Yemen's small-scale agriculture. Not much is known about this species hence the data deficient status.

References

Agamodon
Endemic fauna of Yemen
Reptiles described in 1901
Taxa named by John Anderson (zoologist)
Reptiles of the Arabian Peninsula